The 1946 Arkansas Razorbacks football team was an American football team that represented the University of Arkansas in the Southwest Conference (SWC) during the 1946 college football season. In their first year under head coach John Barnhill, the Razorbacks compiled a 6–3–2 record (5–1 against SWC opponents), finished in a tie with Rice for first place in the SWC, and outscored their opponents by a total of 136 to 92. The Razorbacks advanced to the 1947 Cotton Bowl Classic, playing LSU to a scoreless tie. After winning only five conference games all decade, the Razorbacks matched that total in one year.

Six Arkansas players received honors from the Associated Press (AP) or United Press (UP) on the 1946 All-Southwest Conference football team: back Clyde Scott (AP-1, UP-1); end Alton Baldwin (AP-1, UP-1); tackle Charles Lively (AP-1, UP-2); back Ken Holland (AP-2, UP-2); center Bill Thomas (AP-2, UP-2); and back Aubrey Fowler (AP-2). Scott also won a silver medal in the 110 meter hurdles at the 1948 Summer Olympics and was later inducted into the College Football Hall of Fame.

The team's statistical leaders included Ken Holland with 397 rushing yards on 112 carries (3.5 yards per carry), quarterback Aubrey Fowler with 320 passing yards, and Clyde Scott with 183 receiving yards on 11 receptions.

Schedule

Cotton Bowl Classic
The 1947 Cotton Bowl Classic was a match-up of rivals who had not played since 1937. The game sold out, but snow and twenty degree weather kept some fans at home from what would come to be known as the Ice Bowl. The Hogs defense kept Y.A. Tittle's Tiger offense out of the end zone from the Arkansas 1, 6, 7, and 8 yard lines, but Arkansas could not capitalize on any of the stops, and gained a lone first down the entire game. The final two plays proved the cold did not stop the teams from having a flair for the dramatic, as Razorback Clyde Scott (a future College Football Hall of Famer) tackled LSU receiver Jeff Odom at the Razorback one, preserving the tie. The Tigers then attempted the go-ahead field goal, but a bad snap ended the game on the final play.

After the season

The 1947 NFL Draft was held on December 16, 1946. The following Razorbacks players were selected.

References

Arkansas
Arkansas Razorbacks football seasons
Southwest Conference football champion seasons
Arkansas Razorbacks football